The New Zealand cricket team toured India in January and February 2023 to play three One Day International (ODI) and three Twenty20 International (T20I) matches. In December 2022, the Board of Control for Cricket in India (BCCI) confirmed the fixtures. 

India won the ODI series 3–0, moving to the top spot in the ICC ODI rankings. Despite a defeat in the first game, India managed to win the T20I series 2–1, claiming a major 168 runs victory over the opposition in the last game.

Squads

New Zealand's Adam Milne and Matt Henry were ruled out from ODI series due to injuries, with Blair Tickner and Doug Bracewell named as their respective replacements. India's Shreyas Iyer was ruled out of ODI series  due to an injury, with Rajat Patidar named as his replacement. India's Ruturaj Gaikwad was ruled out of T20I series due to an injury.

ODI series

1st ODI

2nd ODI

3rd ODI

T20I series

1st T20I

2nd T20I

3rd T20I

References

External links
 Series home at ESPNcricinfo

2023 in Indian cricket
2023 in New Zealand cricket
New Zealand cricket tours of India
International cricket competitions in 2022–23